Alessia Mia Teresa Russo (born 8 February 1999) is an English professional footballer who plays as a forward for Manchester United in the Women's Super League and the England national team.

She has previously played for Chelsea, Brighton & Hove Albion and North Carolina Tar Heels, as well as representing England at all age groups.

Club career

Early career
After playing for Bearsted Girls U10 as a child, Russo also played county schools' football for Kent Schools FA whilst attending St Simon Stock School in Maidstone. She began her career at Charlton Athletic's centre of excellence, before joining and captaining Chelsea's development squad. Her first and only senior appearance with Chelsea came during the first round of the FA WSL Continental Cup on 2 July 2016.

Brighton & Hove Albion
In January 2017, Russo joined newly promoted WSL 2 side Brighton & Hove Albion ahead of the 2017 FA WSL Spring Series. She made her Brighton debut on 5 February 2017 in an FA Cup third round victory against AFC Wimbledon. On 11 February, Russo scored Brighton's first ever goal at WSL level in the team's Spring Series opener, a 1–1 draw with London Bees.

North Carolina Tar Heels
 
In autumn 2017, Russo moved to the United States to play college soccer, joining ACC team North Carolina Tar Heels alongside England youth teammate Lotte Wubben-Moy. As a freshman she appeared in 19 games, making 18 starts. She finished as the leading scorer on the team with nine goals as well as two assists and earned several accolades including co-ACC Freshman of the Year, ACC All-Freshman Team selection and United Soccer Coaches All-East Region first team selection. The team won the 2017 ACC Women's Soccer Tournament, beating Duke 1–0 in the final having finished runners-up to Duke in the regular season. Russo was named tournament MVP. In 2018, despite missing the postseason with a broken leg, Russo earned a United Soccer Coaches first-team All-America selection, the first Tar Heel to make the first team since Crystal Dunn in 2013, and was named ACC Offensive Player of the Year as North Carolina won the regular season title for the first time since 2008. In 2019, Russo returned from injury to make a career-high 24 appearances and once again led the team in goals with 13. The team defended the regular season title, won the 2019 ACC Women's Soccer Tournament and reached the 2019 Women's College Cup Final, losing on penalties to Stanford after a goalless draw. Individually Russo was named first-team All-ACC for the third year in a row, ACC Tournament MVP for a second time and United Soccer Coaches first team All-American for a second time. In August 2020, Russo announced she was forgoing her final year of college eligibility amid uncertainty around the season due to the COVID-19 pandemic.

Manchester United
On 10 September 2020, Russo signed a two-year contract with the option for a third year with Manchester United, the club she grew up supporting. She made her debut three days later as a half-time substitute in a 5–2 league victory over Birmingham City, registering an assist. She scored her first goal for the club in the following game, starting in a 3–0 victory over Brighton & Hove Albion. Russo was nominated for WSL Player of the Month in October 2020 with three goals and one assist in three appearances. However, she would miss the rest of the 2020-21 season after tearing her hamstring during training.

In the 2021–22 season, Russo led the team in goals with 11 goals in 30 appearances in all competitions and was named the inaugural winner of the team's Players' Player of the Year award.

During the January 2023 transfer window, with six months left on her contract, Russo was the subject of two world record transfer bids from WSL rivals Arsenal worth more than the £400,000 Barcelona paid for Keira Walsh in September 2022. Both were rejected.

On 5 March 2023, Russo scored her first hat-trick in Manchester United's 5–1 victory over Leicester City in the WSL to extend Manchester United's lead at the top of the Women's Super League.

International career

Youth
Russo has represented England on the under-15, under-17 and under-19, under-20 and under-21 national teams. In October 2015, she scored five goals against Croatia during a 13–0 2016 UEFA Women's Under-17 Championship qualification win before scoring a hat-trick against Estonia in the following game. Russo finished joint top-scorer in qualifying with 9 goals and then again at 2016 UEFA Women's Under-17 Championship, scoring 5 goals including a brace against Germany in a 4–3 semi-final defeat as England finished third. She competed at the 2016 FIFA U-17 Women's World Cup in Jordan and was part of the squad that finished third at the 2018 FIFA U-20 Women's World Cup.

Senior
On 26 February 2020, Russo was called up to the senior England national team for the first time as part of the 2020 SheBelieves Cup squad, initially as a training player but was later added as an injury replacement for Lucy Bronze. She made her senior international debut on 11 March 2020 in the final game of the tournament, appearing as a 76th minute substitute for Toni Duggan in a 1–0 defeat to Spain. On 30 November 2021, she scored her first international goals, a hat-trick in a national record 20–0 victory over Latvia during 2023 World Cup qualifying. Timed at 11 minutes, the hat-trick was the fastest by any England player in history. 

In June 2022, Russo was included in Sarina Wiegman's England squad for UEFA Women's Euro 2022. She appeared in all six games, all as a substitute, during the campaign as England won the Euros for the first time. She ended the tournament with four goals, the fourth an audacious back-heel between the legs of Sweden keeper Hedvig Lindahl in the semi-final. This total placed her third highest, behind her teammate Beth Mead and Germany's Alexandra Popp (six each). Her goal against Sweden was awarded "Goal of the Tournament" by UEFA and was later nominated for the 2022 FIFA Puskás Award.

Personal life
Born in Maidstone, Kent, Russo is of Italian descent. Her Sicilian grandfather moved to England in the 1950s. Her father, Mario, played non-league football for Metropolitan Police and brother, Giorgio, has also played non-league football for various teams, most recently for Ramsgate. Her brother, Luca, went to the University of Missouri on a track and field scholarship.

In 2006, Russo was a mascot for her future United manager Casey Stoney, who was captain of Charlton Athletic while Russo was at the London club's Centre of Excellence.

Career statistics

College

Club
.

International
Statistics accurate as of match played 22 February 2023.

International goals
As of match played 16 February 2023. England score listed first, score column indicates score after each Russo goal.

Honours
North Carolina Tar Heels
Atlantic Coast Conference regular season: 2018, 2019
ACC Women's Soccer Tournament: 2017, 2019
NCAA Division I College Cup runners-up: 2018, 2019

England

 UEFA Women's Championship: 2022
Arnold Clark Cup: 2022, 2023

England U20
FIFA U-20 Women's World Cup third place: 2018

England U17
 UEFA Women's Under-17 Championship third place: 2016

Individual
 UEFA Women's Under-17 Championship Team of the Tournament: 2016
 UEFA Women's Under-17 Championship Top Scorer: 2016
 UEFA Women's Under-17 Championship qualification Top Scorer: 2016
ACC Freshman of the Year: 2017
ACC Offensive Player of the Year: 2018
United Soccer Coaches NCAA Division I first team All-America: 2018, 2019
FA Women's Super League Player of the Month: March 2022
 FA Women's Super League Goal of the Month: November 2021
 PFA Fans' Player of the Month: November 2022
Manchester United Women's Players' Player of the Year: 2021–22
UEFA Women's Championship Bronze Boot: 2022
UEFA Women's Championship Goal of the Tournament: 2022
Freedom of the City of London (announced 1 August 2022)

References

External links
 University of North Carolina player profile
 Profile at the Manchester United F.C. website
 Profile at the Football Association website
 
 
 

1999 births
Living people
English women's footballers
Women's association football midfielders
Chelsea F.C. Women players
Women's Super League players
Sportspeople from Maidstone
North Carolina Tar Heels women's soccer players
Brighton & Hove Albion W.F.C. players
Manchester United W.F.C. players
Expatriate women's soccer players in the United States
English people of Sicilian descent
England women's international footballers
UEFA Women's Euro 2022 players
English people of Italian descent
UEFA Women's Championship-winning players